The 1927 Vanderbilt Commodores football team represented Vanderbilt University in the 1927 Southern Conference football season. The 1927 season was Dan McGugin's 23rd year as head coach. Running back Jimmy Armistead led the nation in scoring in 1927 with 138 points. The team's quarterback was Bill Spears. One fellow wrote Vanderbilt produced "almost certainly the legit top Heisman candidate in Spears, if there had been a Heisman Trophy to award in 1927."

Schedule

Season summary

Chattanooga
Vanderbilt started the season with a 45–18 victory over Chattanooga. Chattanooga did not lose another game and was champion of the Southern Intercollegiate Athletic Association.

Ouachita
In the second week of play, Ouachita was defeated 39–10.

Centre
Vanderbilt overwhelmed Centre 53–6.

Texas

In Dallas, the Commodores suffered the season's only loss to Texas Longhorns 13–6. Texas scored on a 20-yard pass from Baldwin to Ford, and on a run from Baldwin. Vanderbilt's lone score came on a 16-yard pass to Owens. Spears fought three Texans as he threw the pass.

The starting lineup was Kelly (left end), Lusky (left tackle), Cecil (left guard), V. Sharpe (center), Oliver (right guard), Abernathy (right tackle), Creson (right end), Spears (quarterback), McIlwain (left halfback), Owen (right halfback), Armistead (fullback).

Tulane
Bernie Bierman thought of ditching his single-wingback formation after the 32–0 win over Tulane, and was convinced to keep it by McGugin.

The starting lineup was Abernathy (left end), Hawkins (left tackle), Kelly (left guard), V. Sharpe (center), Cecil (right guard), Lusky (right tackle), Creson (right end), Spears (quarterback), Owen (left halfback), McIlwain (right halfback), Armistead (fullback).

Kentucky
Kentucky was beaten 34–6. The starting lineup was James (left end), Hawkins (left tackle), Kelly (left guard), Oliver (center), Cecil (right guard), Lusky (right tackle), Creson (right end), Spears (quarterback), Owen (left halfback), McIlwain (right halfback), Armistead (fullback).

Georgia Tech

A wet field and a strong defense, ranked by one researcher as best in the South, helped Georgia Tech reassert itself and hold Vanderbilt to a scoreless tie, despite the Commodores having the upper hand in play. A strong game had been predicted, showcasing each team's backfield stars in Stumpy Thomason of Tech and Bill Spears of Vanderbilt. Vernon Sharpe suffered a knee injury before the game.

The starting lineup was Abernathy (left end), Hawkins (left tackle), Kelly (left guard), V. Sharpe (center), Cecil (right guard), Lusky (right tackle), Creson (right end), Spears (quarterback), Owen (left halfback), McIlwain (right halfback), Armistead (fullback)

Tennessee

Robert Neyland was hired to coach Tennessee in 1926 by Nathan Dougherty with the explicit goal to "even the score with Vanderbilt", and had his first great team in 1927. McGugin's Commodores led 7–0 until a late Dick Dodson run tied the score. "After the game McGugin questioned each of his players as to his whereabouts during the run. Without exception the players claimed that two men had blocked them. McGugin shrugged. "Well, we'll just protest the play. It's perfectly obvious that Tennessee had twenty-two men on the field."

Vanderbilt center Vernon Sharpe arguably had the better season, but was outperformed by Tennessee's Elvin Butcher.

The starting lineup was Abernathy (left end), Hawkins (left tackle), James (left guard), V. Sharpe (center), Cecil (right guard), Lusky (right tackle), Creson (right end), Spears (quarterback), Owen (left halfback), McIlwain (right halfback), Armistead (fullback).

Maryland

Spears played only in the first half in the 39–20 win over Maryland, but completed 10 of 12 passes.

Sewanee
Vanderbilt defeated Sewanee 26–6. The starting lineup was Abernathy (left end), Hawkins (left tackle), Oliver (left guard), V. Sharpe (center), Cecil (right guard), Lusky (right tackle), Creson (right end), Owen (quarterback), McIlwain (left halfback), Sims (right halfback), Armistead (fullback).

Alabama

The Commodores faced Wallace Wade's Alabama Crimson Tide in the season finale. Spears gained more than the entire Alabama backfield as the Commodores won 14–7. The highlight of Vanderbilt's first scoring drive was a pass from Spears to Armistead of 20 yards, down to the 3-yard line, from which Armistead later ran it in. On Alabama's scoring drive, Red Brown ran 23 yards on a reverse, down to the 4-yard line. Tony Holm eventually got the score. In the fourth quarter, Spears led the winning drive, once circling end for 34 yards, tackling by Starling just as he seemed to break free. He then passed to Larry Creson for 10 yards, ran for 6, and then 13 more around end to the 16-yard line. After Spears and Armistead worked it down to the 9-yard line, a pass to Roy Gibson got the touchdown.

Postseason
Spears passed for 1,207 yards and 9 touchdowns. An all-senior football team at the end of the year used Vandy's offensive system.

Personnel

Coaching Staff
 Dan McGugin (Michigan '03), head coach
 Johnny "Red" Floyd (Vanderbilt '20), assistant coach
 Lewie Hardage (Vanderbilt '12), backfield coach
 Hek Wakefield (Vanderbilt '24), end coach
 Gus Morrow (Vanderbilt '22), line coach

References

Additional sources
 

Vanderbilt
Vanderbilt Commodores football seasons
Vanderbilt Commodores football